Marcel Chauvenet (27 June 1906 – 21 August 1988) was a French sculptor. His work was part of the sculpture event in the art competition at the 1948 Summer Olympics.

References

1906 births
1988 deaths
20th-century French sculptors
20th-century French male artists
French male sculptors
Olympic competitors in art competitions
People from Perpignan